Ethmia persica is a moth in the family Depressariidae. It was described by Andras Kun in 2007. It is found in Iran.

References

Moths described in 2007
persica